Agenor (Ancient Greek: Ἀγήνωρ or Αγήνορι Agēnor; English translation: 'heroic, manly') was the name of the following Greek mythological characters:
Agenor, son of Poseidon and king of Tyre.
 Agenor of Argos, son of either Ecbasus, Triopas, or Phoroneus.
 Agenor, an Egyptian prince as one of the sons of King Aegyptus. He married the Danaid Cleopatra, daughter of King Danaus of Libya either by the hamadryads Atlanteia or Phoebe. Agenor was killed along with his brothers, except Lynceus, by their wives during their wedding night at the behest of their father. Agenor was the son of Aegyptus by an Arabian woman and thus full brother of Istrus, Chalcodon, Chaetus, Diocorystes, Alces, Alcmenor, Hippothous, Euchenor and Hippolytus. In some accounts, he could be a son of Aegyptus either by Eurryroe, daughter of the river-god Nilus, or Isaie, daughter of King Agenor of Tyre.
 Agenor, the betrothed of Andromeda, otherwise called Phineus.
 Agenor, son of King Pleuron and grandson of Aetolus.
 Agenor, one of the Niobids.
 Agenor, a warrior in the army of the Seven against Thebes. For trying to rescue Tages, his brother, who had been wounded in battle by Hypseus in the river, Agenor eventually was drowned.
 Agenor, son of Phegeus and murderer of Alcmaeon.
 Agenor, son of Antenor and a character in Homer's Iliad.
Agenor, one of the sons of King Aeolus of Lipara, the keeper of the winds. He had five brothers namely: Periphas, Euchenor, Klymenos, Xouthos and Macareus, and six sisters: Klymene, Kallithyia, Eurygone, Lysidike, Kanake and an unnamed one. According to various accounts, Aeolus yoked in marriage his sons, including Agenor, and daughters in order to preserve concord and affection among them.
 Agenor, one of the Suitors of Penelope who came from Dulichium along with other 56 wooers. Euryalus, with the other suitors, was slain by Odysseus with the aid of Eumaeus, Philoetius, and Telemachus.
 Agenor, also one of the Suitors of Penelope from Zacynthus with other 43  wooers. He suffered the same fate as his above namesake.
 Agenor, son Areus, son of Ampyx. He was the father of Preugenes and paternal grandfather of Patreus, the founder of Patrae.
Agenor, husband of Dioxippe and father of Sipylus, who unwittingly killed his mother.

Notes

References 

Apollodorus, The Library with an English Translation by Sir James George Frazer, F.B.A., F.R.S. in 2 Volumes, Cambridge, MA, Harvard University Press; London, William Heinemann Ltd. 1921. ISBN 0-674-99135-4. Online version at the Perseus Digital Library. Greek text available from the same website.
Gaius Julius Hyginus, Fabulae from The Myths of Hyginus translated and edited by Mary Grant. University of Kansas Publications in Humanistic Studies. Online version at the Topos Text Project.
Homer, The Iliad with an English Translation by A.T. Murray, Ph.D. in two volumes. Cambridge, MA., Harvard University Press; London, William Heinemann, Ltd. 1924. . Online version at the Perseus Digital Library.
Homer, Homeri Opera in five volumes. Oxford, Oxford University Press. 1920. . Greek text available at the Perseus Digital Library.
Homer, The Odyssey with an English Translation by A.T. Murray, Ph.D. in two volumes. Cambridge, MA., Harvard University Press; London, William Heinemann, Ltd. 1919. . Online version at the Perseus Digital Library. Greek text available from the same website.
Lucius Mestrius Plutarchus, Morals translated from the Greek by several hands. Corrected and revised by. William W. Goodwin, Ph.D. Boston. Little, Brown, and Company. Cambridge. Press Of John Wilson and son. 1874. 5. Online version at the Perseus Digital Library.
Pausanias, Description of Greece with an English Translation by W.H.S. Jones, Litt.D., and H.A. Ormerod, M.A., in 4 Volumes. Cambridge, MA, Harvard University Press; London, William Heinemann Ltd. 1918. . Online version at the Perseus Digital Library
Pausanias, Graeciae Descriptio. 3 vols. Leipzig, Teubner. 1903.  Greek text available at the Perseus Digital Library.
Statius, The Thebaid translated by John Henry Mozley. Loeb Classical Library Volumes. Cambridge, MA, Harvard University Press; London, William Heinemann Ltd. 1928.  Online version at the Topos Text Project.
Tzetzes, John, Allegories of the Odyssey translated by Goldwyn, Adam J. and Kokkini, Dimitra. Dumbarton Oaks Medieval Library, Harvard University Press, 2015. 
Tzetzes, John, Book of Histories, Book VII-VIII translated by Vasiliki Dogani from the original Greek of T. Kiessling's edition of 1826. Online version at theio.com

Sons of Aegyptus
Niobids
Princes in Greek mythology
Suitors of Penelope
Theban characters in Greek mythology
Characters in Seven against Thebes